The Ambassador of Malaysia to the Hashemite Kingdom of Jordan is the head of Malaysia's diplomatic mission to Jordan. The position has the rank and status of an Ambassador Extraordinary and Plenipotentiary and is based in the Embassy of Malaysia, Amman.

List of heads of mission

Chargés d'Affaires to Jordan

Ambassadors to Jordan

See also
 Jordan–Malaysia relations

References 

 
Jordan
Malaysia